Alan Scott Bolden is an American attorney, law partner, and former radio and television host. He is currently a television and radio legal and political commentator, and as an attorney, continues to represent the interests of several nonprofits, including the United Negro College Fund, the Greater Washington Urban League, and the National Newspaper Publishers Association.

Early life

Bolden was born in Joliet, Illinois to Raymond and Kathleen Bolden. Bolden's father, Raymond Bolden, was a criminal defense and civil rights attorney as well as a judge,[1] and was the head of the NAACP in Will County, Illinois.[2] His mother, Kathleen Bolden, was a civil rights activist. She supported his father's law practice in the early years, and later returned to college and graduate school to receive degrees in Black History and Sociology. She was a college professor, administrator and entrepreneur who owned Educational Associates and several businesses in the education arena.[3]

As a child and teenager, Bolden often traveled with his father, as the older Bolden tried cases across the state.  They were often the only people of color in those courtrooms, which inspired his feelings about the law.[4] Bolden was also inspired by the way his father commanded the courtroom.   Bolden would go with his father as he visited clients in local and federal prisons and observed how his father would earn clients’ respect and trust.   Watching his father's oratorical skills and presence before judges would shape Bolden's professional and personal life and would inspire Bolden to begin his own legal career.[2][5]

Education

At Morehouse College and later at Howard University School of Law, he trained for leadership under the tutelage of Dr. Benjamin E. Mays, Dr. Robert Brisbane, Judge William Bryant, Attorney and civil rights activist, Julian Dugas, Howard Law School Dean, J. Clay Smith, Judge Luke C. Moore and Judge Wiley A. Branton, among others.

Legal career

Upon graduation, Bolden worked as Assistant District Attorney in the New York County District Attorney's Office where he prosecuted hundreds of misdemeanor and felony cases.   He went on to work as Legal Counsel to the Committee on the Judiciary Council of the District of Columbia.   In 1991, Bolden started as an associate with the law firm Reed Smith, making partner in four years, and was the first African American in the history of the firm to be promoted from associate to full equity partner.[6] Later, he became Managing Partner of the firm's D.C. office, representing a number of high-profile clients in civil, regulatory and white-collar litigation matters and throughout his legal career, he has successfully defended many high-profile athletes, entertainers and politicians.[7] In 2018, Bolden resumed serving as office managing partner of the Reed Smith, Washington, D.C. office. He is also a former Member of Reed Smith's Executive Committee.[8] In 2021, he was representing Baltimore's State’s Attorney Marilyn Mosby and Baltimore City Council President Nick Mosby.[9] In 2022, Bolden stepped down as Managing Partner of the Reed Smith Washington, D.C. office.

Community and civic engagement

While maintaining a full-time white-collar defense and litigation practice, Bolden led the District of Columbia Chamber of Commerce and the District of Columbia Democratic Party, hosted a local Washington, D.C., radio show called “What Matters Most” and co-hosted[2][1] his own cable television show called “Building Bridges for Business.”[8] In 2006, Bolden ran to become an at-large member of the Council for the District of Columbia and lost.[6] Bolden serves on the Board of Trustees of Morehouse College[10] and on the Board of Visitors of the Howard School of Law as well as on the board of the Joint Center for Political and Economic Studies.   Additionally, he continues to represent the interests of several nonprofits, including the United Negro College Fund, the Greater Washington Urban League, and the National Newspaper Publishers Association.

Media appearances

Bolden is a frequent political and legal analyst and has made appearances on local and major national news channels—including CNN, Fox News, MSNBC, Fox Business Network and other media outlets—as a regular commentator, sharing his views on politics, law, society and business.[11][12][13][14] He has appeared on CNN's “Newsroom” and “Situation Room,” MSNBC's “The Rachel Maddow Show,” Fox News Channel's ‘Happening Now” and “Tucker Carlson Tonight,” Fox Business Network and Fox Business Network's “After the Bell.”

Awards

Bolden has received numerous honors and awards including Attorney of the Year Award from the Boy Scouts of America, the Minority Corporate Counsel Association's Rainmaker Award, was designated a White Collar Criminal Defense Super Lawyer from 2013 to 2017.[15] In 2021, the Washington Bar Association (WBA) named A. Scott Bolden as the recipient of its prestigious Ollie May Cooper Award.  In 2022, Bolden was named to Savoy Magazine's list of Most Influential Black Lawyers.

Professional and community affiliation 
 National Bar Association Political Action Committee – Chairman, Board of Directors (2017)
 Joint Center for Political and Economic Studies – Member, Board of Governors (2013–present)
 Legal Aid Society of the District of Columbia – Member, Board of Directors (2012–2015)
 The Economic Club of Washington, D.C. – Member (1998–present)
 Morehouse College Board of Trustees (2016–present)
 Howard University School of Law – Member, Board of Visitors (2011–present)
 Federal City Council – Member, Executive Board (2008–2013)
 Candidate for D.C. Council, At Large (2006)
 Individual Development Corporation – Board of Directors (1999–2013)
 D.C. Chamber of Commerce – Member, Board of Directors (1998–2013)
 D.C. Chamber of Commerce – Chairman (1998)
 District of Columbia Bar – Board of Governors (1999–2003)
 D.C. Chamber of Commerce Political Action Committee – Chairman (2000–2002)
 D.C. Democratic State Committee – Chair (2002–2004)
 D.C. Water and Sewer Authority – Board Member (1998–2002)
 District Court of the District of Columbia's Committee on Grievances – Member (1998–2003)
 Sequoia National Bank – Director (1998–2004)   Kappa Alpha Psi fraternity (Life Member)[15]

References 

 1 2 "Retired judge celebrates 80th birthday". The Times Weekly.com. 18 December 2013.
 1 2 3 "A. Scott Bolden | the HistoryMakers". The History Makers. Retrieved 1 August 2018.
 ↑ Mayer, Madhu (3 December 2014). "'She Lives In You: The Kathleen Bolden Story'". The Times Weekly.com.
 ↑ Bartle, Jodi (2018). "The Rainmakers Attorneys who bring innovation to their practices".
 ↑ Mbuya, Judith (30 June 2008). "A. Scott Bolden". Washington Post.
 1 2 "Bolden Takes Helm at Large D.C. Firm". The Afro. 11 January 2018. Retrieved 1 August 2018.
 ↑ "A. Scott Bolden: The Hardest Working Man in Big Law". 2018-07-11.
 1 2 "A. Scott Bolden | Professionals | Reed Smith LLP". Reed Smith. Retrieved 1 August 2018.
 ↑ "Federal grand jury investigating Baltimore officials Nick, Marilyn Mosby; churches, campaign staff subpoenaed".
 ↑ "Morehouse College | Trustees". Morehouse College. Retrieved 9 September 2018.
 ↑ "Judges outweighing influence over Trump's policies?". 2018-07-29.
 ↑ "DNI Coats: I 'in no way meant to be disrespectful' to President". MSNBC.
 ↑ "Trump's SCOTUS pick: Easy to be nominated, hard to be confirmed". 2018-07-12.
 ↑ "CNN Panelist: Donald Trump's NFL firing remark shows privilege - CNN Video". CNN.
 1 2 "Awards & Recognitions | A. Scott Bolden, Esq". 17 July 2021.
 Bolden, A. Scott. "RE: Letter to a Rainmaker, 27 Years Later". Reed Smith. Retrieved 12 February 2019.

American lawyers
Living people
Morehouse College alumni
Year of birth missing (living people)